Count Dmitri Martynovich Solsky (–) was an Imperial Russian politician. He served in the position of Imperial State Controller (an Imperial Minister equivalent) in 1878–1889. After leaving that post he was appointed to the Imperial State Council. He served as Chairman of the Imperial State Council in 1905–1906. He was created a Count in 1902.

References 
 Out of My Past: The Memoirs of Count Kokovtsov Edited by H.H. Fisher and translated by Laura Matveev; Stanford University Press, 1935.
 The Memoirs of Count Witte Edited and translated by Sydney Harcave; Sharpe Press, 1990.

1833 births
1910 deaths
Russian monarchists
Politicians from Saint Petersburg
Members of the State Council (Russian Empire)
Active Privy Councillors, 1st class (Russian Empire)
State controllers of Russia